Ro Jai-bong (born February 8, 1936) is a South Korean politician. He served from December 1990 to May 1991 as the 22nd prime minister of South Korea.

References

1936 births
Living people
People from Changwon
Prime Ministers of South Korea
New York University alumni
Brigham Young University alumni
Academic staff of Seoul National University
Seoul National University alumni
Chiefs of Staff to the President of South Korea